Porcupines are large rodents with coats of sharp spines, or quills, that protect them against predation. The term covers two families of animals: the Old World porcupines of family Hystricidae, and the New World porcupines of family  Erethizontidae. Both families belong to the infraorder Hystricognathi within the profoundly diverse order Rodentia and display superficially similar coats of rigid or semi-rigid quills, which are modified hairs composed of keratin. Despite this, the two groups are distinct from one another and are not closely related to each other within the Hystricognathi. The largest species of porcupine is the third-largest living rodent in the world, after the capybara and beaver.

The Old World porcupines (Hystricidae) live in Italy, Asia (western and southern), and most of Africa. They are large, terrestrial, and strictly nocturnal.

The New World porcupines (Erethizontidae) are indigenous to North America and northern South America. They live in wooded areas and can climb trees, where some species spend their entire lives. They are less strictly nocturnal than their Old World counterparts and generally smaller.

Weighing , they are rounded, large, and slow, and use an aposematic strategy of defence. Porcupines' colouration consists of various shades of brown, grey and white. Porcupines' spiny protection resembles that of the only distantly related erinaceomorph hedgehogs and Australian monotreme echidnas as well as tenrecid tenrecs.

Etymology
The word "porcupine" comes from Latin porcus pig + spina spine, quill, via Old Italian (Italian "porcospino", thorn-pig)—Middle French—Middle English. A regional American name for the animal is "quill-pig".

A baby porcupine is a porcupette. When born, a porcupette's quills are soft hair; they harden within a few days, forming the sharp quills of adults.

Evolution

Fossils belonging to the genus Hystrix date back to the late Miocene of the continent of Africa.

Species

Taxonomy
A porcupine is any of 58 species of rodents belonging to the families Erethizontidae (genera: Coendou, Erethizon, and Chaetomys) or Hystricidae (genera: Atherurus, Hystrix, and Trichys). The two families of porcupines are quite different, and although both belong to the Hystricognathi branch of the vast order Rodentia, they are not closely related.

Old World compared with New World species
The 11 Old World porcupines tend to be fairly large and have spines grouped in clusters.

The New World porcupines evolved their spines independently (through convergent evolution) and are more closely related to several other families of rodents than they are to the Old World porcupines.

Longevity
Porcupines have a relatively high longevity and hold the record for being the longest-living rodent, with one individual named Cooper living over 32 years.

Diet
The North American porcupine is a herbivore and often climbs trees for food; it eats leaves, herbs, twigs, and green plants such as clover. In the winter, it may eat bark.

The African porcupine is not a climber; instead, it forages on the ground. It is mostly nocturnal but will sometimes forage for food in the day, eating bark, roots, fruits, berries, and farm crops. Porcupines have become a pest in Kenya and are eaten as a delicacy.

Defense
Defensive behaviour displays in a porcupine depend on sight, scent, and sound. Often, these displays are shown when a porcupine becomes agitated or annoyed. There are four main displays seen in a porcupine: (in order from least to most aggressive) quill erection, teeth clattering, odor emission, and attack. A porcupine's colouring aids in part of its defence as most of the predators are nocturnal and colour blind. A porcupine's markings are black and white. The dark body and coarse hair of the porcupine are a dark brown/black and when quills are raised, present a white strip down its back mimicking the look of a skunk. This, along with the raising of the sharp quills, deters predators. Along with the raising of the quills, porcupines clatter their teeth to warn predators not to approach. The incisors vibrate against each other, the strike zone shifts back, and the cheek teeth clatter. This behaviour is often paired with body shivering, which is used to further display the dangerous quills. The rattling of quills is aided by the hollow quills at the back end of the porcupine. The use of odor is when the sight and sound have failed. An unpleasant scent is produced from the skin above the tail in times of stress and is often seen with quill erection. If these processes fail, the porcupine will attack by running sideways or backwards into predators. A porcupine's tail can also be swung in the direction of the predator; if contact is made, the quills could be impaled into the predator causing injury or death.

Quills

Porcupines' quills, or spines, take on various forms, depending on the species, but all are modified hairs coated with thick plates of keratin, and embedded in the skin musculature. Old World porcupines  have quills embedded in clusters, whereas in New World porcupines, single quills are interspersed with bristles, underfur, and hair.

Quills are released by contact or may drop out when the porcupine shakes its body. New quills grow to replace lost ones. Despite what is commonly believed, porcupines do not have the ability to launch their quills at range.

There are some possible antibiotic properties within the quills, specifically associated with the free fatty acids coating the quills. The antibiotic properties are believed to aid a porcupine that has suffered from self-injury.

Uses by humans

Porcupines are seldom eaten in Western culture but are eaten often in Southeast Asia, particularly Vietnam, where the prominent use of them as a food source has contributed to declines in porcupine populations. 

Naturalist William J. Long reported the taste of the North American porcupine as "vile" and "malodorous" and delightful only to a lover of strong cheese. With regards to a Maine state law that restricted the killing of porcupines to keep them available as emergency game for people lost in the woods, he noted: "It is undoubtedly a good law; but I cannot now imagine any one being grateful for it, unless the stern alternative were death or porcupine."

More commonly, their quills and guard hairs are used for traditional decorative clothing; for example, their guard hairs are used in the creation of the Native American "porky roach" headdress. The main quills may be dyed, then applied in combination with thread to embellish leather accessories, such as knife sheaths and leather bags. Lakota women would harvest the quills for quillwork by throwing a blanket over a porcupine and retrieving the quills left stuck in the blanket.

The presence of barbs, acting like anchors, causes increased pain when removing a quill that has pierced the skin. The shape of the barbs makes the quills effective for penetrating the skin and for remaining in place. The quills have inspired research for such applications as the design of hypodermic needles and surgical staples. In contrast to the current design for surgical staples, the porcupine quill and barb design would allow easy and painless insertion, as the staple would stay in the skin using the anchored barb design rather than being bent under the skin like traditional staples. Porcupines are also sometimes kept as an Exotic pet.

The porcupine is often used as a symbol of American libertarianism due to its natural embodiment of defensiveness and the non-aggression principle.

Habitat

Porcupines occupy a small range of habitats in tropical and temperate parts of Asia, Southern Europe, Africa, and North and South America. They live in forests and deserts, rocky outcrops, and hillsides. Some New World porcupines live in trees, but Old World porcupines prefer a rocky environment. They are generally nocturnal but are occasionally active during daylight.

Classification

Porcupines are distributed into two evolutionarily independent groups within the suborder Hystricomorpha of the Rodentia.

 Infraorder Hystricognathi
 Family Hystricidae: Old World porcupines
 African brush-tailed porcupine, Atherurus africanus
 Asiatic brush-tailed porcupine, Atherurus macrourus
 Crested porcupine, Hystrix cristata
 Cape porcupine, Hystrix africaeaustralis
 Indian porcupine, Hystrix indicus
 Malayan porcupine, Hystrix brachyura
 Himalayan porcupine, Hystrix (brachyura) hodgsoni
 Sunda porcupine, Hystrix javanica
 Sumatran porcupine, Hystrix (Thecurus) sumatrae
 Thick-spined porcupine, Hystrix (Thecurus) crassispinis
 Philippine porcupine, Hystrix (Thecurus) pumilis
 Long-tailed porcupine, Trichys fasciculata
 Parvorder Phiomorpha sensu stricto
 Family Thryonomyidae: cane rats
 Family Petromuridae: Dassie rats
 Family Bathyergidae: African mole-rats
 Parvorder Caviomorpha
 Superfamily Erethizontoidea
 Family Erethizontidae: New World porcupines
 Brazilian porcupine, Coendou prehensilis
 Bicolored-spined porcupine, Coendou bicolor
 Andean porcupine, Coendou quichua
 Black dwarf (Koopman's) porcupine, Coendou nycthemera (koopmani)
 Rothschild's porcupine, Coendou rothschildi
 Santa Marta porcupine, Coendou sanctemartae
 Mexican hairy dwarf porcupine, Coendou mexicanus
 Paraguaian hairy dwarf porcupine, Coendou spinosus
 Bahia porcupine, Coendou insidiosus
 Brown hairy dwarf porcupine, Coendou vestitus
 Streaked dwarf porcupine, Coendou ichillus
 Black-tailed hairy dwarf porcupine, Coendou melanurus
 Roosmalen's dwarf porcupine, Coendou roosmalenorum
 Frosted hairy dwarf porcupine, Coendou pruinosus
 Stump-tailed porcupine, Coendou rufescens
 North American porcupine, Erethizon dorsatum
 Bristle-spined porcupine, Chaetomys subspinosus (sometimes considered an echimyid)
 Superfamily Cavioidea
 Family Hydrochaeridae: capybara
 Family Caviidae: Guinea-pigs
 Family Dasyproctidae: agoutis and acouchis
 Superfamily Octodontoidea
 Family Abrocomidae: chinchilla-rats
 Family Octodontidae: degus
 Family Ctenomyidae: tuco-tucos
 Family Echimyidae: spiny rats
 Family Myocastoridae: nutrias
 Family Capromyidae: hutias
 Superfamily Chinchilloidea
 Family Chinchillidae: chinchillas and allies
 Family Dinomyidae: pacaranas

See also 
 Pangolins, another mammal group with protective keratin body coverings 
 Armadillos, another mammal group with protective keratin body coverings

References

External links

 Wildlife Conservation: Porcupine – African Wildlife Foundation
 "Resource Cards: What About Porcupines?" – Pacific Northwest National Laboratory
 Porcupine control in the western states – University of North Texas Digital Library
 The Complete Resource To Keeping Porcupines As Pets

 
Body plans
Hystricognath rodents
Rodents by common name